Meterana grandiosa is a species of moth in the family Noctuidae. This species is endemic to New Zealand. It is classified as "At Risk, Relict'" by the Department of Conservation.

Taxonomy 
This species was first described and illustrated by Alfred Philpott in 1903 and was given the name Melanchra grandiosa. Philpott used a female specimen he collected at West Plains in Southland in May. George Hudson discussed and illustrated this species in his 1928 book The Butterflies and Moths of New Zealand. In 1988 John S. Dugdale placed this species within the genus Meterana. The hototype specimen is held at the New Zealand Arthropod Collection.

Description 
Larvae are green in appearance with a broad white lateral stripe. As they mature larvae turn a pinkish colour and can grow to be 3.3 cm in length.

Philpott originally described the adult female of the species as follows:

Distribution 
This species is endemic to New Zealand. M. grandiosa has occurred in Wairarapa, Central Otago, Otago Lakes, Dunedin and Southland zones. However this species is now locally extinct in its type locality of West Plains and has not been collected in Dunedin since the 1960s.

Life cycle and behaviour 
Larvae hide underneath the bark of their host plants during the day which makes them difficult to detect. Larvae pupate between November and December and the adult moth emerges during the autumn months of mid April to early June.

Host species and habitat 

The plant host species for the larvae of M. grandiosa are small-leaved Olearia species. These include O. hectorii and O. odorata.

Conservation status 
This moth is classified under the New Zealand Threat Classification system as being "At Risk, Relict". One of the reasons for this classification is that the habitat of this species is under threat from land development. The elimination of the host plants of this species has resulted in their extinction from sites in New Zealand.

References

Moths of New Zealand
Endemic fauna of New Zealand
Moths described in 1903
Xyloryctinae
Endangered biota of New Zealand
Endemic moths of New Zealand